Siena College was a private, Catholic college located in Memphis, Tennessee. It was established by Dominican nuns in 1922 as St. Agnes College, the first Catholic women's college in the Diocese of Nashville and in the Memphis metro area. Initially, the campus housed a Kindergarten through twelfth grade girls school and the college. It was the first college in Memphis to offer adult evening courses. In 1939, the Saint Agnes Academy moved to a new campus (where it remains), and the name of St. Agnes College was changed to Siena College. The college eventually was moved to its own new campus on Poplar Avenue in 1953 where it was known for excellence in education until it closed in 1972.

Despite not officially merging with another Catholic college in Memphis, Christian Brothers University, CBU did change from being an all-male college to a coeducational institution in 1972. Many Siena students became the first female students at CBU.

Defunct private universities and colleges in Tennessee
Christian Brothers University
Defunct Catholic universities and colleges in the United States
Educational institutions established in 1922
Educational institutions disestablished in 1972
Universities and colleges in Memphis, Tennessee
Catholic universities and colleges in Tennessee
1922 establishments in Tennessee